Grammer is an unincorporated community in Rock Creek Township, Bartholomew County, in the U.S. state of Indiana.

History
A post office was established at Grammer in 1893 and remained in operation until it was discontinued in 1972. Grammer was likely named for a railroad official. The town had two general stores operating simultaneously in the 1940s and 1950s as well as a barber shop and grain elevator.  Grammer School, built in 1899, operated as a 1-8 school until consolidating with Rock Creek School in 1958.

Geography

Notable people
 Jim McWithey, Indy car driver

References

Unincorporated communities in Bartholomew County, Indiana
Unincorporated communities in Indiana